Asajj Ventress is a character from the Star Wars franchise. Originally intended to appear as an antagonist in the 2002 film Star Wars: Episode II – Attack of the Clones, she was first introduced in the 2003 micro-series Star Wars: Clone Wars (voiced by Grey DeLisle), and is part of the Star Wars Legends continuity. A different version of Ventress was featured in the 2008 animated film The Clone Wars and the subsequent television series of the same name, in which she is voiced by Nika Futterman. The character also appears in tie-in Star Wars media such as books, comics, and video games, and has become a favorite among fans.

In the Star Wars universe, Ventress is a former member of the Nightsisters, a cult of witches from the planet Dathomir, who was sold into slavery as a child, and was subsequently taken in as a Jedi Padawan by the Jedi Master who saved her. Following her master's death in battle, Ventress falls to the dark side of the Force and becomes Count Dooku's informal Sith apprentice and personal assassin. As a Sith assassin, she wields two lightsabers with curved handles that can attach together and form a double bladed weapon with a curve in the middle. Originally a villain opposing the Jedi and the Galactic Republic, she is eventually betrayed by Dooku and, after a failed attempt to exact revenge on him, tries to distance herself from her old life by turning to bounty hunting. Despite her efforts, however, Ventress finds herself drawn back into the Clone Wars when she helps her former Jedi enemies in various situations, slowly redeeming herself. In the 2015 novel Star Wars: Dark Disciple, adapted from an eight-episode arc intended for the seventh season of The Clone Wars, Ventress works with the Jedi Quinlan Vos in a secret mission to assassinate Dooku, and ultimately sacrifices her life to save Vos from him.

Characterization

Creation 
Before the character of Count Dooku was developed, the art department for Star Wars: Episode II – Attack of the Clones developed a villainess as a potential main antagonist.

When the Star Wars expanded universe resurrected this female Sith idea as one of Dooku's underlings who could appear more frequently throughout the Clone Wars, this nameless Separatist Commander was dubbed Juno Eclipse but the name was rejected as "not villainous enough", and she was renamed Asajj Ventress. The name Juno Eclipse was later given to a character from the video game Star Wars: The Force Unleashed, with no relation to Ventress.

LucasArts's Leland Chee suggested using "Asajj" as the character's first name, naming her after the character Asaji from Akira Kurosawa's Throne of Blood.

Portrayal 
Asajj Ventress was voiced by Grey DeLisle in the 2003 Clone Wars micro-series, and by Nika Futterman in the 2008 animated film Star Wars: The Clone Wars and its subsequent TV series, as well most of her video game and other animated appearances.

Appearances

The Clone Wars
Ventress is an antagonist in the 2008 The Clone Wars film. As the disciple of Count Dooku, she helps him with his plan to turn Jabba the Hutt against the Galactic Republic by kidnapping his son Rotta. Ventress fights Jedi Knight Anakin Skywalker and apprentice Ahsoka Tano, who rescue Rotta, and later also battles Jedi Master Obi-Wan Kenobi, who defeats her, forcing her to flee.

Ventress is a lead character in all five broadcast seasons of the subsequent The Clone Wars animated series. In season one, Ventress travels to the moon of Rugosa as Dooku's emissary to form an alliance between the planet Toydaria and the Separatists. The king of Toydaria is reluctant, but allows her forces to face Yoda in battle to prove which side is superior. When the king decides to side with the Republic, Dooku gives his assassin permission to kill the king so they may have a better chance with the successor. Yoda thwarts her attempt, however, and she is forced to flee. Dooku orders Ventress to spy on the planet Kamino for the Separatist forces, planning an invasion with General Grievous to destroy the clone production facilities while stealing Jango Fett's DNA template from the production facility. Ventress then frees Trade Federation Viceroy Nute Gunray from the custody of Luminara Unduli and Ahsoka, fighting the two Jedi before ultimately succeeding in her mission.

In season three, Ventress' back story is explained: she hails from the planet Dathomir and was sold by the Nightsisters to criminals. She would have likely been killed in a pirate raid if not for Jedi Ky Narec, who had crashed on Rattatak. Narec sensed her potential and trained her in the ways of the Force. However, warlord Osika Kirske killed Narec before Ventress could become a full-fledged Jedi. She developed an implacable hatred of the Jedi Order, which she believes abandoned her master and ignored the bloodshed on her planet.

Eventually, Darth Sidious comes to see Ventress as a liability, and orders Dooku to eliminate her. Dooku attempts, unsuccessfully, to kill her, as she engages Anakin and Obi-Wan in one final duel, in which she is wounded. She turns to the Nightsisters of Dathomir for help, and they engineer Savage Opress to serve as Dooku's new apprentice in order to earn his trust, before ultimately killing him on Ventress' behalf. The scheme fails, however, when Opress turns on both Dooku and Ventress and attempts to kill them both.

In season four, Ventress returns to the Nightsisters. She undergoes the ritual to become a full-fledged Nightsister, but is thwarted when Grievous' droid army slaughter the Nightsisters while their matriarch Mother Talzin is rendered incorporeal. Told by Talzin to find her own path, Ventress later helps Boba Fett's team of bounty hunters in a dangerous but profitable mission. She then finally makes peace with her past with an ideal future as a bounty hunter. While still haunted by Opress, she tracks him to Raydonia to collect a bounty on him. When she arrives on Opress’ spaceship, she confronts him and Darth Maul as they are about to kill Obi-Wan. Ventress teams up with her old nemesis to fight Maul and Opress, but they are ultimately forced to escape in their shuttle.

In season five's final arc, Ventress nearly apprehends Ahsoka, who has been framed for attempting to destroy the Jedi Temple. She ultimately helps Ahsoka escape on the condition that she would be exonerated. Ventress later helps Anakin to find out that Barriss Offee, who stole her lightsabers, framed Ahsoka.

In the 2015 novel Dark Disciple, based on unfinished episodes from The Clone Wars, Ventress teams up with undercover Jedi Master Quinlan Vos in an "un-Jedi like" mission to kill Dooku. Ventress falls in love with Vos. After Vos is turned to the dark side by Dooku, Ventress ultimately manages to redeem him, but she is killed by Dooku with Force lightning shortly after. Vos later returns Ventress' body to Dathomir so that she may rejoin her fallen sisters in spirit.

Other works 
Star Wars Resistance executive producer/head writer Brandon Auman revealed in 2021 that prior to its cancellation the series had almost featured a duel between Ventress and sequel trilogy antagonist Kylo Ren (respectively the first and last characters to use the titles of "Supreme Leader" in the Star Wars universe). How Ventress would still be alive after the events of Dark Disciple has not been revealed.

Legends
With the 2012 acquisition of Lucasfilm by The Walt Disney Company, most of the licensed Star Wars novels and comics produced since the originating 1977 film Star Wars were rebranded as Star Wars Legends and declared non-canon to the franchise in April 2014.

Clone Wars

Ventress first appeared as a supporting villain in the 2003 micro-series Star Wars: Clone Wars. When Sith Lord Count Dooku arrives to add the planet Rattatak to his Separatist movement, he witnesses Ventress fighting several opponents in a large arena, defeating them all before claiming to be a Sith warrior. When Dooku laughs aside the notion that she could be a Sith, Ventress tries to attack him, but the Sith Lord renders her unconscious with Force lightning. After she awakens, Dooku attacks her again, but she jumps backwards and ignites her lightsabers. In her quarters, a short duel takes place to which Dooku cuts her two lightsabers in half, rendering her defenseless. Although Ventress is defeated, Dooku is impressed by her abilities and recruits her to be his apprentice by appealing to her hatred of the Jedi.

Darth Sidious later personally assigns Ventress to kill Anakin Skywalker, and Dooku presents the Dark Jedi with a new pair of lightsabers with curved hilts. After Ventress leaves, Sidious remarks that she is certain to fail, but that she will serve as a useful test for Anakin. Ventress then engages the Republic fighter forces in orbit of the planet Muunilinst and lures Anakin into a chase. Ventress and Anakin go to Yavin IV, and a fierce battle from the forest to the Massassi temple takes place. Though she initially gains the upper hand in their duel, Anakin calls upon his immense connection to the Force and brutally overpowers her, causing her to fall over the edge of a cliff.

Novels
As portrayed in the novel The Cestus Deception, Ventress appears on Ord Cestus during the Bio-Droid Crisis. She is behind the X'Ting criminal Trillot's dealings with Obi-Wan. Ventress also destroys the Republic Cruiser carrying Barrister Doolb Snoil returning to the Republic; however, Snoil survives. Ventress later challenges Kenobi and his fellow Jedi Master Kit Fisto to a duel. Ventress disarms Fisto but is then engaged by Kenobi. Their duel leads them into an underwater chamber and Ventress is forced to escape after Kenobi slices her across her abdomen. She lets loose a smoke bomb and flees back to the Confederacy and Dooku.

Comic books
In the Star Wars: Republic story "The New Face of War", Ventress joins forces with the bounty hunter Durge on the invasion of Naboo's moon, Ohma-D'un. Together they use swamp gas to wipe out the Gungan colony and prepare to launch a biological attack on Naboo. In the ensuing battle with Republic forces, Ventress makes her first public appearance in the war (in the chronological timeline). Ventress kills Jedi Master Glaive in the battle and cuts off his apprentice Zule's left arm. She engages Obi-Wan and the pair are evenly matched. Ventress escapes with Durge after ARC Trooper Alpha destroys their fueling station.

In Star Wars: Jedi - Mace Windu, Dooku sends Ventress to Ruul to help frame Mace Windu. Ventress briefly confronts Sora Bulq, who had been secretly corrupted by Dooku, as a ruse. Ventress kills Mira in the battle and then engages Jedi Masters Sian Jeisel, K' Kruhk and Rhad Tarn all of whom she defeats singlehandedly. After framing Windu for the crime, Ventress corrupts Tarn. While Tarn fights against Jeisel, Ventress defeats K'Kruhk in combat. Windu's timely arrival saves the Jedi; Ventress finds that she is no match for Windu's power and is forced to flee.

In the Republic story "Blast Radius", Ventress and Durge again engage the Jedi taskforce in a facility on the planet Queyta. Ventress briefly fights against Kenobi and Fay. Durge kills Jon Antilles and Knol Ven'Nari. After Ven'nari is killed in an explosion, Durge pushes Antilles into a lava pit. Ventress uses her lightsabers to collapse the ceiling, sending a shower of lava onto Diath's head. Although the Separatists claim a victory, Ventress spares Obi-Wan's life under Dooku's orders, though she impales Fay in the chest with her lightsabers. Fay gives Obi-Wan the last of her strength to escape the facility.

In "The Battle of Jabiim", Ventress captures Obi-Wan and Alpha from Jabiim and transports them to Rattatak for torture and interrogation. Obi-Wan and Alpha escape in the following story, "Hate & Fear", and the Jedi Master takes Ky Narec's lightsaber, making the animosity between him and Ventress deeply personal.

In "Dreadnoughts of Rendili", Ventress and fellow Dark Jedi Tol Skorr fight Obi-Wan and Quinlan Vos on Titavian IV. Obi-Wan unleashes a rancor to distract Ventress, but she manipulates it via the dark side. Obi-Wan fights Ventress after killing the rancor but he escapes with Vos before the duel is settled. Grievous arrives to rescue the two Dark Jedi, shaming Ventress in their master Dooku's eyes.

Ventress then travels to Coruscant to kill Vos and Obi-Wan. During the mission, she discovers Anakin's secret marriage to Senator Padmé Amidala. Enraged, Anakin engages Ventress. During the duel, Ventress scars Skywalker's face but she is once again overpowered and suffers another huge fall. Republic Intelligence assumes that she is dead.

"Obsession" marks the character's final appearance in Republic. Ventress survives her encounter with Anakin on Coruscant but is badly injured. She is sent to Boz Pity where Dooku places her in a bacta tank and fits her with cybernetic modifications. One month later, Obi-Wan infiltrates the facility. Ventress wakes up and subsequently attacks him. She fights against both Obi-Wan and Anakin but is abandoned when Dooku orders an IG-100 MagnaGuard to kill her as she runs towards Dooku's shuttle. Enraged and badly wounded, Ventress tries to kill Obi-Wan as he tries to help her. Anakin slashes her from behind, mortally wounding her. As she lies dying, she tells him the location of the Separatists' next target. Believing Ventress to be dead, Obi-Wan puts her on a ship bound for Coruscant. However, Ventress survives by placing herself in a Sith trance. While on the shuttle, she emerges from her trance and orders the pilots to take her as far away as possible from Dooku, the Jedi, and the war.

Video game appearances

Star Wars Battlefront: Renegade Squadron
Ventress is a playable hero character in Star Wars Battlefront: Renegade Squadron. She is available for the Separatists on Saleucami and Sullust.

Star Wars: The Clone Wars video games
Ventress appears in several Star Wars: The Clone Wars video game spin-offs, including as a playable character in The Clone Wars - Lightsaber Duels and Lego Star Wars III: The Clone Wars, and as a boss in The Clone Wars - Jedi Alliance and The Clone Wars - Republic Heroes. Nika Futterman reprises her role as Ventress in all these games.

Star Wars: The Force Unleashed duology
Ventress has a non-canon appearance in the PlayStation 2, Wii, and PlayStation Portable versions of Star Wars: The Force Unleashed as a costume skin that can be used on Starkiller. In the Wii version, she is also a playable character in the 2-player fighting game mode called Duel Mode. She is also playable in the multiplayer mode for the Wii version of the sequel, Star Wars: The Force Unleashed II. Ventress is voiced by Grey DeLisle in the first game and by Nika Futterman in the second game.

Other Star Wars video games
The character is featured in several Star Wars games that were released after Disney's acquisition of Lucasfilm:
Ventress appears in the tower defense game Star Wars: Galactic Defense as a playable character for the Dark Side campaign, and a boss for the Light Side campaign.
Ventress is a playable character in Star Wars: Galaxy of Heroes, a turn-based RPG. She is classified as a Nightsister and a Separatist support, armed with powerful area of effect moves, and can grow stronger when characters are defeated.
Ventress is a playable character in Lego Star Wars: The Force Awakens and Lego Star Wars: The Skywalker Saga via downloadable content.

Relationships

Mentorship tree

References

External links
 
 

Television characters introduced in 2003
Animated characters introduced in 2003
Characters created by Genndy Tartakovsky
Characters created by George Lucas
Extraterrestrial supervillains
Fantasy television characters
Female characters in animated series
Female characters in television
Female supervillains
Female film villains
Fictional space pilots
Fictional bodyguards
Fictional bounty hunters
Fictional commanders
Fictional cyborgs
Fictional defectors
Fictional energy swordfighters
Fictional female assassins
Fictional henchmen
Fictional humanoids
Fictional mercenaries
Fictional revolutionaries
Fictional telekinetics
Fictional war veterans
Fictional witches
Fictional women soldiers and warriors
Orphan characters in television
Star Wars characters who are Force-sensitive
Star Wars animated characters
Star Wars: The Clone Wars characters
Star Wars video game characters
Film supervillains